Norman Hardy (11 March 1892 – 17 November 1923) played first-class cricket for Somerset between 1912 and 1921. He was born at Norton Malreward, Somerset and died at Fishponds, Bristol.

Hardy was a right-handed, lower order batsman and a right-arm, fast-medium bowler. He first played for Somerset in two matches within a week in 1912, but achieved little in them. In 1919, he returned to the team as a professional for four matches, during which he both made his highest first-class score and had his best bowling return. In the match against Gloucestershire at County Ground, Taunton, in which Sydney Rippon played for Somerset under a false name, Hardy made 38, batting at No 10 and adding 58 for the ninth wicket with his captain, Jack White. Against Surrey, he took four first-innings wickets for 22 runs. In his four matches in 1919, Hardy took 18 first-class wickets at an average of 13 runs per wicket to be top of the Somerset averages for the season.

Hardy played in just two matches as an amateur in 1920 and three in 1921 without making much impact. He died suddenly from heart failure while playing football, aged 31.

References

1892 births
1923 deaths
English cricketers
Somerset cricketers